The Party of Democratic Activity ( or A-SDA) was a conservative political party in Bosnia and Herzegovina.

History
The party was established in February 2008 as a breakaway from the Party of Democratic Action. Based in Cazin, its founders included town mayor Nermin Ogrešević. In the 2010 general elections, A-SDA ran only in the Federation of Bosnia and Herzegovina part of Bosnia. It received 1.7% of the vote, failing to win a seat in the national House of Representatives, However, it won one seat in the House of Representatives of the Federation of Bosnia and Herzegovina with 1.9% of the vote.

In the 2014 elections the party increased its vote share to 2.25%, winning a seat in the national House of Representatives. It also won two seats in the Federal House. Its member of the country's legislature was Jasmin Emrić, who holds a seat in the Federation of Bosnia and Herzegovina's first division.

Elections

Parliamentary elections

References

External links
Official website 

2008 establishments in Bosnia and Herzegovina
Bosniak political parties in Bosnia and Herzegovina
Conservative parties in Bosnia and Herzegovina
Political parties established in 2008
Political parties in Bosnia and Herzegovina
Pro-European political parties in Bosnia and Herzegovina